Icon is the sixth studio album by Norwegian urban duo Madcon. It was released on 27 September 2013. The album debuted at number one on the Norwegian Albums Chart.

Track listing

Charts

Release history

References

2013 albums
Madcon albums